Cynthia Renay Neeley is an American politician currently serving in the Michigan House of Representatives for the 34th district. She is married to current Flint mayor Sheldon Neeley.

Education
Neeley graduated from Star City High School in Star City, Arkansas. Neeley later earned her certification in cosmetology from Mott Community College.

Career
On March 10, 2020, Neeley was elected to the Michigan House of Representatives where she represents the 34th district. Neeley assumed office on March 17, 2020. Neeley is a Democrat. On March 8, 2020, Neeley announced her endorsement of Joe Biden in the 2020 United States presidential election. On August 5, 2020, Neeley won the primary election for re-election to the state house.

Personal life
Neeley resides in Flint, Michigan. Neeley is married to her predecessor in the state house and current mayor of Flint, Sheldon Neeley. Together, they have two children.

References

Living people
Politicians from Flint, Michigan
People from Star City, Arkansas
Women state legislators in Michigan
African-American women in politics
African-American state legislators in Michigan
Democratic Party members of the Michigan House of Representatives
Spouses of Michigan politicians
21st-century American women politicians
21st-century American politicians
Year of birth missing (living people)
21st-century African-American women
21st-century African-American politicians